Muirenn, Gaelic-Irish female given name.

Bearers of the name

 Muirne, mother of Fionn mac Cumhail
 Muirenn bean Ragallaig, died 643.
 Muirenn ingen Cellach Cualann, Queen of Brega, died 748.
 Muirenn ingen Cellaig, Abbess of Kildare, died 831.
 Muirenn ingen Suairt, Abbess of Kildare, fl. 909, died 916.
 Muirenn ingen mic Colmáin, Abbess of Kildare, died 962.
 Muirenn ingen Congalaig, Abbess of Kildare, died 979.

External links
 http://medievalscotland.org/kmo/AnnalsIndex/Feminine/Muirenn.shtml

Irish-language feminine given names